Talles Brener de Paula (born 12 May 1998), known as Talles, is a Brazilian professional footballer who plays as a midfielder for Rukh Lviv.

Club career
Talles is a product of the Inter de Limeira and Fluminense youth sportive systems.

In February 2021 he signed contract with the Ukrainian Premier League Olimpik Donetsk and made his debut for this team as a substituted second half-time player in the losing away match against Dynamo Kyiv on 13 February 2021.

Five months later, in July 2021, he was transferred to another team – FC Rukh Lviv, and made his debut for FC Rukh as the start squad player in an away win against MFC Mykolaiv on 21 September 2021 in the Round of 32 of the Ukrainian Cup.

On 2 April 2022, Talles joined KuPS in Finland on loan until 30 June 2022, with an option to extend the loan until the end of 2022.

References

External links
 Talles at playmakerstats.com (English version of ogol.com.br)
 

1998 births
Living people
People from Divinópolis
Brazilian footballers
Association football midfielders
Fluminense FC players
Mirassol Futebol Clube players
Esporte Clube Noroeste players
Vila Nova Futebol Clube players
FC Olimpik Donetsk players
FC Rukh Lviv players
Kuopion Palloseura players
Campeonato Brasileiro Série C players
Ukrainian Premier League players
Brazilian expatriate footballers
Expatriate footballers in Ukraine
Brazilian expatriate sportspeople in Ukraine
Expatriate footballers in Finland
Brazilian expatriate sportspeople in Finland
Sportspeople from Minas Gerais